Xenocytaea zabkai is a jumping spider.

Name
The species has been named after Marek Żabka, a Polish salticid specialist.

Description
Xenocytaea zabkai females are about 4 mm long. Males are not yet known.

Distribution
Xenocytaea zabkai is only known from Viti Levu, Fiji.

References
 Berry, J.W., Beatty, J.A. & Proszynski, J. (1998). Salticidae of the Pacific Islands. III. Distribution of Seven Genera, with Description of Nineteen New Species and Two New Genera. Journal of Arachnology 26(2):149-189. PDF

Salticidae
Spiders of Fiji
Endemic fauna of Fiji
Spiders described in 1998